The Aldermen Islands are a small group of rocky islets to the southeast of Mercury Bay in the North Island of New Zealand.

The islands were named 'the Court of Aldermen' by Captain Cook and his crew on 3 November 1769 after previously naming Mayor Island. The Aldermen group consists of four main islands: Hongiora, Middle, Ruamahuanui, and Ruamahuaiti. The islands are a forested nature reserve hosting rare species including the tuatara. Access is by permit only.

The Aldermen Islands are the remains of eroded Pliocene or Early Pleistocene lava domes that form part of the Whitianga Group. Approximately 18,000 years ago during the Last Glacial Maximum when sea levels were over 100 metres lower than present day levels, the islands were hilly features surrounded by a vast coastal plain. Sea levels began to rise 7,000 years ago, after which the islands separated from the rest of New Zealand. When sea levels were lower, the Tairua River flowed south of the features, travelling eastwards towards the Pacific Ocean.

See also

 List of islands of New Zealand
 List of islands
 Desert island

References

Uninhabited islands of New Zealand
Thames-Coromandel District
Islands of Waikato
Volcanoes of Waikato
Pliocene lava domes
Pleistocene lava domes